Ludlow is an unincorporated community in Scott County, Mississippi, United States. Ludlow has a post office with ZIP code 39098.

Hal Lee, a professional baseball player during the 1930s, was born in Ludlow.

References

Unincorporated communities in Scott County, Mississippi
Unincorporated communities in Mississippi